is a former Japanese football player who plays as a centre back.

Club career
Mizumoto was born in Ise. After graduating from Mie High School, he joined J1 League side JEF United Ichihara (later JEF United Chiba). His first appearance in J1 League came on 20 May 2004 against Oita Trinita. He scored his first professional goal on 22 July 2006 against Sanfrecce Hiroshima.

He moved to Gamba Osaka in 2008 but he failed to claim a regular place there. On 23 June 2008 he transferred to Kyoto Sanga FC.

National team career
In June 2005, Mizumoto was selected Japan U-20 national team for 2005 World Youth Championship. At this tournament, he played full-time in all 4 matches. In August 2008, he was selected Japan U-23 national team for 2008 Summer Olympics. At this tournament, he played full-time in all matches as captain.

Mizumoto made his senior national team debut on 4 October 2006, in a friendly match against Ghana.

Club statistics
.

1Includes A3 Champions Cup, Japanese Super Cup, FIFA Club World Cup and J.League Championship.

National team statistics

Appearances in Major Competitions

Honours

Club
JEF United Chiba
J.League Cup: 2005, 2006
Sanfrecce Hiroshima
J1 League: 2012, 2013, 2015
Japanese Super Cup: 2013, 2014, 2016

Individual
J.League Best XI: 2012

References

External links

Japan National Football Team Database

1985 births
Living people
Association football people from Mie Prefecture
Japanese footballers
Japan youth international footballers
Japan international footballers
J1 League players
J2 League players
J3 League players
JEF United Chiba players
Gamba Osaka players
Kyoto Sanga FC players
Sanfrecce Hiroshima players
Matsumoto Yamaga FC players
FC Machida Zelvia players
SC Sagamihara players
Footballers at the 2006 Asian Games
Olympic footballers of Japan
Footballers at the 2008 Summer Olympics
Asian Games competitors for Japan
Association football central defenders